Kristian August Emil Arentzen (10 November 1823 - 30 December 1899) was a Danish writer, literary historian and educator.

Biography
Arentzen was born in Copenhagen, Denmark.
He was the son of  Gunder August Arentzen and Marie Elisabeth  Smidt.
In 1841 he became a student of Det von Westenske Institut where he devoted himself to the study of Old Norse literature.
In 1852 he received state support for a study trip to Iceland.
He prepared for a master's conference in aesthetics, which he submitted in 1856. 
In 1861, he become assistant professor at  Metropolitanskolen where he stayed until 1872.
In 1879,  he was appointed Knight of the Order of the Dannebrog.

In 1857, he completed his first book of poetry Et Livsstadium followed by Digtsamling in 1862 and Ny Digtsamling in 1867.
Arentzen undertook to depict the poetic age of Jens Baggesen (1764–1826) and Adam Oehlenschläger (1779-1850), a work he completed in eight volumes (Baggesen and Oehlenschläger - Litteraturhistoriske Studie, 1870-78).

References

1823 births
1899 deaths
Writers from Copenhagen
19th-century Danish writers
19th-century male writers
19th-century Danish educators
19th-century Danish poets
Danish literary historians
Translators from Old Norse
Knights of the Order of the Dannebrog
19th-century translators